General elections were held in Antigua and Barbuda on 29 November 1960. They were won by the governing Antigua Labour Party (ALP), whose leader Vere Bird was re-elected as Chief Minister, a position he had held since 1 January 1960 when the position was created.

The 1960 elections were the only general elections held in the territory during its membership of the West Indies Federation, a brief attempt to create a federal state in the British West Indies. Voter turnout was 38%.

Results

References

Elections in Antigua and Barbuda
Antigua
1960 in Antigua and Barbuda
Landslide victories
November 1960 events in North America